The Home Front is a 10-minute 1940 Canadian documentary film, made by the National Film Board of Canada (NFB) as part of the wartime Canada Carries On series. The film was produced and directed by Stanley Hawes. The film's French version title is La Femme et la Guerre.

Synopsis
In 1940, as Canadian men are being mobilized to serve in the military, three million women are also mobilized to serve in the "home front". For the second time in a generation, women again have shouldered the burden of maintaining the households and taking on roles that will allow men to fight. From playing a role in hospitals and medical research, industrial labour, hospitality, education and domesticity, the service these women provided to their country is significant.

On the home front, women can strengthen the war effort by strengthening the household, and, if they can, to enter the industrial workforce to supplement men in many positions at munitions factories. Women can take on specialized civilian roles such as driving heavy equipment or flight training at flying clubs. In the military, Royal Canadian Air Force (RCAF) women became clerks, drivers, photographers, air photo interpreters, weather observers, instrument mechanics, parachute riggers as well as many administrative and technical positions in the RCAF. Most women served at British Commonwealth Air Training Plan stations across Canada.

As the stress of "total war" becomes greater, it is imperative that women in important organizations such as the Red Cross can play a dominant role on the home front. From its headquarters in Toronto, the Red Cross is in touch with depots and workrooms across the country where women provide services that "lessen the suffering of others". Others such as the Women's Institutes and Imperial Order Daughters of the Empire also provide essential services, such as raising funds for weapons of war.

Women will also play a part after the war, in building a new world.

Cast
 Elsie MacGill, aircraft designer
 Helen Harrison, flight instructor
 Mrs. W.R. Campbell, national chair of women's war work at the Red Cross in Canada
 Monica Nuegen, Canadian Broadcasting Corporation (CBC) reporter

Production
Typical of the NFB's Second World War documentary short films in the Canada Carries On series, The Home Front was created as a morale boosting propaganda film. The film relied heavily on newsreel material but also included footage shot for the film by  cinematographers Roger Barlow and J.B. Scott, with on-location sound recording by technicians William H. Lane, C.J. Quick and Walter Darling. The unusual use of intertitles similar to those used in silent film, provided onscreen dialogue for the audience.

The deep baritone voice of stage actor Lorne Greene was featured in the narration of The Home Front. Greene was known for his work on both radio broadcasts as a news announcer at CBC as well as narrating many of the Canada Carries On series. His sonorous recitation led to his nickname, "The Voice of Canada", and to some observers, the "voice-of-God". When reading grim battle statistics or narrating a particularly serious topic, he was known as "The Voice of Doom".

Reception
The Home Front was produced in 35 mm for the theatrical market. Each film in the Canada Carries On series was shown over a six-month period as part of the shorts or newsreel segments in approximately 800 theatres across Canada. The NFB had an arrangement with Famous Players theatres to ensure that Canadians from coast-to-coast could see them, with further distribution by Columbia Pictures.

After the six-month theatrical tour ended, individual films were made available on 16 mm to schools, libraries, churches and factories, extending the life of these films for another year or two. They were also made available to film libraries operated by university and provincial authorities. A total of 199 films were produced before the series was canceled in 1959.

Historian Malek Khouri analyzed the role of the NFB wartime documentaries with The Home Front characterized as an example of a propaganda film. "During the early years of the NFB, its creative output was largely informed by the turbulent political and social climate the world was facing. World War II, Communism, unemployment, the role of labour unions, and working conditions were all subjects featured by the NFB during the period from 1939 to 1946".

The role of women depicted in Home Front also showed an acceptance of a new role to come in postwar years. In an examination of the role of the NFB in wartime, historian Gary Evans observed: "If contemporary feminists sense omissions and patronizing in the film, one must at least acknowledge that [The Home Front] expressed a positive attitude to working women and was conditioning audiences to become accustomed to new and permanent women's roles in the workplace."

See also
 Wings on her Shoulder (1943), a NFB documentary on the Royal Canadian Air Force Women's Division
 Rosies of the North (1999), a NFB documentary on the women who worked at the Canadian Car and Foundry building fighter and bomber aircraft in the Second World War

References

Notes

Works Cited

Bibliography

 Barris, Ted. Behind The Glory: The Plan that Won the Allied Air War. Markham, Ontario: Thomas Allen & Son Publishers, 2005. .
 Bennett, Linda Greene. My Father's Voice: The Biography of Lorne Greene. Bloomington, Indiana: iUniverse, Inc., 2004. .
 Ellis, Jack C. and Betsy A. McLane. New History of Documentary Film. London: Continuum International Publishing Group, 2005. .
 Evans, Gary. John Grierson and the National Film Board: The Politics of Wartime Propaganda. Toronto: University of Toronto Press, 1984. .
 Khouri, Malek. Filming Politics: Communism and the Portrayal of the Working Class at the National Film Board of Canada, 1939-46. Calgary, Alberta, Canada: University of Calgary Press, 2007. .
 Lerner, Loren. Canadian Film and Video: A Bibliography and Guide to the Literature. Toronto: University of Toronto Press, 1997. .
 Ramsay, Christine, ed. Making it Like a Man: Canadian Masculinities in Practice. Waterloo, Ontario, Canada: Wilfrid Laurier University Press, 2011. .
 Rist, Peter. Guide to the Cinema(s) of Canada. Westport, Connecticut: Greenwood Publishing Group, 2001. .
 Ziegler, Mary. We Serve That Men May Fly: The Story of the Women's Division of the Royal Canadian Air Force. Hamilton, Ontario, Canada: RCAF (WD) Association, 1973. No ISBN.

External links
 
 Home Front at NFB.ca

1940 films
Canadian aviation films
Canadian black-and-white films
Canadian short documentary films
Canadian World War II propaganda films
Documentary films about military aviation
English-language Canadian films
National Film Board of Canada documentaries
Documentary films about women in World War II
1940 documentary films
Black-and-white documentary films
Films directed by Stanley Hawes
Films scored by Lucio Agostini
Canada Carries On
Quebec films
Columbia Pictures short films
1940s short documentary films
1940s Canadian films